was a town located in Nishisonogi District, Nagasaki Prefecture, Japan. Iōjima was the only town on the island of Iōjima near Nagasaki City. The island includes beaches and an onsen.

As of 2003, the town had an estimated population of 883 and a density of 390.71 persons per km². The total area was 2.26 km².

On January 4, 2005, Iōjima, along with the towns of Kōyagi, Nomozaki, Sanwa, Sotome and Takashima (all from Nishisonogi District), was merged into the expanded city of Nagasaki and no longer exists as an independent municipality.

The onsen on the island is called Nagasaki Onsen Yasuragi Ioujima and offers natural springs and a fermented rice bran bath.

Technically an island, Iōjima is linked to mainland Kyūshū by a bridge.

External links
 Official website of the City of Nagasaki in Japanese (some English content)

Dissolved municipalities of Nagasaki Prefecture